Mervyn Richards is a former Antiguan international footballer and cricketer.

He played for Antigua and Barbuda in their 1986 FIFA World Cup qualification campaign, featuring in two games against Haiti in August 1984; a 2–1 victory and a 4–0 loss.

He is the younger brother of cricketer Viv Richards. From 2004–2008, he served as president of the Antigua and Barbuda Football Association.

References 

1953 births
Living people
Antigua and Barbuda cricketers
Antigua and Barbuda footballers
Antigua and Barbuda expatriate footballers
Expatriate footballers in Jamaica
Antigua and Barbuda expatriate sportspeople in Jamaica
Cavalier F.C. players
Antigua and Barbuda international footballers
Association footballers not categorized by position
Leeward Islands cricketers